Dufur School is a K-12 public school of approximately 280 students in Dufur, Oregon, United States.

Academics
In 2008, 79% of the Dufur High School seniors received their high school diploma. Of 19 students, 15 graduated, 3 dropped out, and 1 received a modified diploma.

References

High schools in Wasco County, Oregon
Public middle schools in Oregon
Public elementary schools in Oregon
Public high schools in Oregon